The Toronto Sun is an English-language tabloid newspaper published daily in Toronto, Ontario, Canada. The newspaper is one of several Sun tabloids published by Postmedia Network. The newspaper's offices is located at Postmedia Place in downtown Toronto. 

The newspaper published its first edition in November 1971, after it had acquired the assets of the defunct Toronto Telegram, and hired portions of the Telegrams staff. In 1978, Toronto Sun Holdings and Toronto Sun Publishing were consolidated to form Sun Publishing (later renamed Sun Media Corporation). Sun Publishing went on to form similar tabloids to the Toronto Sun in other Canadian cities during the late 1970s and 1980s. The Sun was acquired by Postmedia Network in 2015, as a part of the sale of the Suns parent company, Sun Media.

History
In 1971, the Toronto Sun Publishing was created and purchased the syndication operations and newspaper vending boxes from the Toronto Telegram, which ceased operations in the same year. The Toronto Sun also recruited staff from the former Telegram conservative broadsheet newspaper, and published its first edition on 1 November 1971. The Sun is considered a spiritual successor to the Telegram. The Sun is the holder of the Telegram archives.

Publisher Doug Chreighton was originally going to name the new newspaper the Toronto News but Andy Donato, who was asked to design the paper's first front page and decided to call the paper the Toronto Sun instead. Creighton decided it was too late to change it and renamed the paper.

The Toronto Sun was originally published out of leased space at the Eclipse White Wear Company Building at 322 King Street West. In 1975, the newspaper moved into the Toronto Sun Building at 333 King Street East which was eventually expanded to six storeys to house all of the newspaper's operations. In 2010, the building was sold to property development company First Gulf, and the Sun consolidated its operations onto the second floor and remained in the building until it relocated offices in 2016.

In 1978, Toronto Sun Holdings and Toronto Sun Publishing were consolidated to form Sun Publishing. The corporation expanded its tabloid footprint, having established its second tabloid, the Edmonton Sun through a partnership agreement with Edmonton Sun Publishing in 1978. The Albertan was acquired in 1980 and made into the company's third tabloid, the Calgary Sun in 1980. 

In 1988, The Washington  Post described the Sun as an example of tabloid journalism.

21st century
In 2004, the Sun began its annual George Gross/Toronto Sun Sportsperson of the Year award. By the mid-2000s, the word "The" was dropped from the paper's name and the newspaper adopted its current logo.

The paper, which boasts the slogan "Toronto's Other Voice" (also once called "The Little Paper that Grew") acquired a television station from Craig Media in 2005, which was renamed SUN TV and later was transformed into the Sun News Network until its demise in 2015. 

As of the end of 2007, the Sun had a Monday through Saturday circulation of approximately 180,000 papers and Sunday circulation of 310,000.

The Sun was acquired by Postmedia in 2015, with its purchase of Sun Media from Quebecor. Following the acquisition of the Sun newspaper chain by PostMedia in 2015, the Toronto Sun staff and operations moved to 365 Bloor Street East, the same building that houses the National Post. However, the two newspapers maintain separate newsrooms. The move occurred in March 2016.

Editorial position

Editorially, the paper frequently follows the positions of traditional Canadian/British conservatism and neo-conservatism in the United States on economic issues. Editorials typically promote individualism, self-reliance, the police, and a strong military and support for troops. Editorials typically condemn high taxes and, most of all, perceived government waste.

Circulation 

The Toronto Sun has seen—like most Canadian daily newspapers—a decline in circulation. Its total circulation dropped by  percent to 121,304 copies daily from 2009 to 2015.

Daily average

Notable staff

Editors-in-chief
The Toronto Sun originally had several editors with various responsibilities, none with the title "editor-in-chief"; however, from 1971 to 1976, Peter Worthington was listed on the newspaper's masthead immediately under the publisher, Doug Creighton.

 Peter Worthington (1976–1982)
 Barbara Amiel (1983–1985)
 John Downing editor (1985–1997), no editor-in-chief until 1995
 Peter O'Sullivan (1995–1999)
 Mike Strobel (1999–2001)
 Mike Therien (2001–2004)
 Jim Jennings (2004–2006)
 Glenn Garnett (2007)
 Lou Clancy (2007–2009)
 James Wallace (2009–2013)
 Wendy Metcalfe (2013–2015)
 Adrienne Batra (2015–present)

Current staff

 Adrienne Batra, editor-in-chief, former comment editor and municipal affairs columnist
Mark Bonokoski, columnist, editorial writer
 Andy Donato, editorial cartoonist
 Tarek Fatah, columnist
Brian Lilley, provincial, national affairs columnist
Steve Simmons, sports columnist

Former staff

 Charles Adler, QMI columnist
 David Akin, columnist
 Barbara Amiel, editor and columnist
 Joan Barfoot, reporter
 Christie Blatchford, columnist (deceased)
 Mark Bourrie, reporter
 Jim Brown, manager (deceased)
 Dalton Camp, columnist (deceased)
 Gordon Chong, columnist (deceased)
 Sheila Copps, columnist
 Michael Coren, QMI columnist
 Danielle Crittenden, reporter, columnist
 John Downing, city hall columnist, editor-in-chief
 Mike Filey, Toronto history columnist  
 Doug Fisher, Parliament Hill columnist (deceased)
 Allan Fotheringham, national affairs columnist (deceased)
 David Frum, columnist
 W. Gifford-Jones, M.D. (pseudonym for Ken Walker), medical columnist
 Edward Greenspan, lawyer, columnist (deceased)
 George Gross, corporate sports editor, columnist (deceased)
 Max Haines, "Crime Flashback" feature (deceased)
 Paul Hellyer, columnist and founding investor (deceased)
 Jim Hunt, sports writer (deceased)
 Ajit Jain, columnist
 George Jonas, columnist (deceased)
 Warren Kinsella, political columnist
 Linda Leatherdale, business editor, columnist
 Ezra Levant, QMI columnist
Sue-Ann Levy, political columnist, former municipal affairs columnist
 Bob MacDonald, columnist (deceased)
 Heather Mallick, columnist
 Salim Mansur, columnist
 Eric Margolis, international affairs columnist, contributing editor
 Rachel Marsden, columnist
 Lois Maxwell (Moneypenney), columnist (deceased)
 Judi McLeod, education reporter
 Ben Mulroney, columnist
 Ted Reeve, sports columnist (deceased)
 Sid Ryan, columnist
 Paul Rimstead, columnist (deceased)
 Laura Sabia, columnist (deceased)
 Morton Shulman, columnist (deceased)
 Joey Slinger, columnist
 Walter Stewart, columnist (deceased)
 John Tory, mayor of Toronto, former Rogers executive 
 Garth Turner, business editor
 Sherri Wood, columnist (deceased)
 Peter Worthington, columnist, former editor (deceased)
 Lubor J. Zink, columnist (deceased)

See also
 Media in Canada
 List of media outlets in Toronto
 List of newspapers in Canada
 List of the largest Canadian newspapers by circulation

References

External links

 
 
 

 
Newspapers published in Toronto
Postmedia Network publications
Newspapers established in 1971
1971 establishments in Ontario
Conservative media in Canada
Daily newspapers published in Ontario